Menorah Synagogue, a member of the Movement for Reform Judaism, is a synagogue in Manchester in the United Kingdom and the place of worship for the Cheshire Reform Congregation. The synagogue is on Altrincham Road in Sharston, Wythenshawe. Its rabbi is Rabbi Fabian Sborovsky. He took up his post on 1 February 2015 in succession to Rabbi Haim Shalom.

See also
 List of Jewish communities in the United Kingdom
 List of former synagogues in the United Kingdom
 Movement for Reform Judaism

References

External links 
 

Reform synagogues in the United Kingdom
Synagogues in Manchester